Mons.Arena is a multi-purpose indoor arena in Mons (Jemappes), Belgium.  Mons.Arena has a capacity of 3,700 people.  It hosts the home games of Belfius Mons-Hainaut basketball club.

In March 2019, the name was changed to Diamonte Mons.Arena until 31 December 2020 because of sponsorship agreements.

References

External links
Venue information
Belstadions.be Information & pictures

Basketball venues in Belgium
Indoor arenas in Belgium
Sports venues in Hainaut (province)
Sport in Mons